Joseph Bottoms is an American actor who won the 1975 Golden Globe Award for New Star of the Year for his role in The Dove. He is also well known for his roles in the television mini-series Holocaust and Disney's The Black Hole.

Career
Bottoms made his screen debut in the television movie Trouble Comes to Town. A year later he played the role of Robin Lee Graham, in The Dove, a real-life story about a teenager sailor's voyage around the world. Bottoms won the Golden Globe Award for New Star of the Year – Actor. 

In the 1978 mini-series Holocaust, he starred as Rudi Weiss, a German Jew who joins the Jewish partisans. The series was well-received, winning the Primetime Emmy Award for Outstanding Miniseries. 

A year later, he appeared in The Black Hole, a science fiction film that grossed over $35 million at the U.S. box office. In 1981, he made his Broadway debut in Fifth of July. The play made its Broadway debut at the New Apollo Theatre on November 5, 1980, directed by Mason with Jeff Daniels reprising the role of Jed, Christopher Reeve as Ken and Swoosie Kurtz as Gwen.

In 1984, he starred with Kirstie Alley in Blind Date. From 1985 to 1986, he was a series regular on Santa Barbara. In 1990, he began a guest arc on the Canadian television series Street Legal. In 1991, he played the second Cal Winters in Days of Our Lives. In 1998 he was cast as a series regular in The Net.

His latest screen appearance was in 1999 in the TV series V.I.P..

Personal life
Bottoms was born in Santa Barbara, California, and is the second son of sculptor James "Bud" Bottoms and Betty (née Chapman). He is the brother of actors Timothy Bottoms, Sam Bottoms, and Ben Bottoms. He has been married twice and twice divorced. Since 1999, he has been running the Bottoms Art Galleries in Santa Barbara that include his father's sculptures.

Filmography

References

External links
 
 
 
 Joseph Bottoms at Filmreference.com
 Joseph Bottoms at TV.com

Living people
American male film actors
American male television actors
American male soap opera actors
Male actors from Santa Barbara, California
20th-century American male actors
21st-century American male actors
New Star of the Year (Actor) Golden Globe winners
Year of birth missing (living people)